Wessex Water Services Limited, known as Wessex Water, is a water supply and sewerage utility company serving an area of South West England, covering 10,000 square kilometres including Bristol, most of Dorset, Somerset and Wiltshire and parts of Gloucestershire and Hampshire. Wessex Water supplies 1.3 million people with around 285 million litres of water a day.

It is regulated under the Water Industry Act 1991.  In 2016, the company had about 2,100 employees.

Wessex Water is owned by the Malaysian power company YTL Corporation. Its headquarters are on the outskirts of Bath in Claverton Down, in a modern energy-efficient building by Bennetts Associates and Buro Happold.

History

The company originated as the Wessex Water Authority, one of ten regional water authorities established by the Water Act 1973 which were privatised in 1989. Wessex Water Services Limited was purchased by American company Enron in 1998 for $2.4 billion and placed in a newly formed subsidiary, Azurix. Following Enron's collapse, Wessex Water was sold to YTL Power International of Kuala Lumpur, Malaysia, in 2002.

The water authority had acquired the assets and duties of a number of public sector and local authority water utilities:

Bristol Avon River Authority
Somerset River Authority
Avon and Dorset River Authority (except the part of the area of that drains to the River Lim)
Bath Corporation
Dorset Water Board
North Wilts Water Board
South Wilts Water Board
Wessex Water Board
West Somerset Water Board
West Wilts Water Board
Bournemouth and District Water Company
Bristol Waterworks Company
Cholderton and District Water Company
West Hampshire Water Company
West Lulworth Water Undertaking

Four people, three of them Wessex Water employees, were killed in an explosion at a company site in Avonmouth on 3 December 2020.

Customer service
Wessex Water achieved a score of 4.53 in Ofwat’s ‘Satisfaction by company’ survey 2012/13 (5 being ‘very satisfied’).

Drinking water quality
In 2013 Wessex Water's compliance with drinking water standards exceeded 99.9% and the company maintained 100% compliance with sewage treatment discharge consents.

Leakage
In both 2011/12 and 2012/13 the company's leakage figure was 69 million litres per day, compared to a yearly average of 73 million litres per day between 2005–10.

Carbon footprint
Wessex Water's greenhouse gas emissions totalled 119 kilotonnes of CO2 equivalent in 2018/19, compared to 149 kilotonnes of CO2 equivalent in 2011/12 and 159 kilotonnes in 2012/13.

Reservoirs and lakes
The company owns and manages several reservoirs including Blashford Lakes in Hampshire, Clatworthy Reservoir, Durleigh Reservoir, Hawkridge Reservoir, Otterhead Lakes, Sutton Bingham Reservoir and Tucking Mill in Somerset, many of which, in addition to supplying drinking water, are used for recreation and as nature reserves.

GENeco
Wessex Water's GENeco subsidiary, established in 2009, operates sewage treatment works. It recycles waste, produces renewable energy and provides the agricultural industry with fertiliser. In summer 2010, GENeco launched the Bio-Bug, a modified VW Beetle that runs on bio-gas generated from waste treated at sewage treatment works. Waste flushed down the toilets of just 70 homes in Bristol is enough to power the Bio-Bug for a year, based on an annual mileage of 10,000 miles.

In November 2014, the UK's first bus powered entirely by human and food waste went into service between Bristol and Bath, run by tour operator Bath Bus Company. Since 2019, biomethane powers buses on one of Bristol's MetroBus routes. The gas is produced at the company's "bioresources and renewable energy park" in Avonmouth, which is run by GENeco.

Environmental record
May 1998 – Found guilty of discharging over 1 million gallons of raw sewage into a Weymouth, Dorset, marina on August Bank Holiday Monday 1997, the busiest day of the year. The company was fined £5,000 with £500 costs.
March 1999 – Ranked 4th in the top ten list of "worst polluters" in England by the Environment Agency.
May 2002 – Fined £8,000 for causing pollution in Dowlais Brook, Cwmbran in June 2001.
April 2003 – Fined £5,000 with £1,000 costs at Minehead Magistrates' Court after pleading guilty to causing poisonous, noxious or polluting matter to enter the Washford River in Somerset.
July 2003 – Described by the Environment Agency as one of the worst "repeat offenders" for pollution incidents.
2004 – Fined six times for environmental pollution incidents.
May 2007 – Fined £1,500 with £1,589 costs by Bristol magistrates after pleading guilty to one offence under the Water Resources Act 1991 of causing sewage to enter controlled waters. Untreated sewage had been allowed to pollute the River Frome in July 2006. The river was polluted again with untreated sewage at Frampton Cotterell in February 2007 and April 2007.
April 2008 – Fined £3,000 with £1,960 costs for allowing sewage to pollute the River Stour.
March 2010 – Fined £6,000 with £2,235 costs at Weymouth Magistrates' Court after allowing sewage to pollute the River Stour near Shaftesbury in March 2009.

References

External links

1973 establishments in England
Companies based in Bath, Somerset
Former nationalised industries of the United Kingdom
Water companies of England
Water pollution in the United Kingdom
Wessex
2002 mergers and acquisitions